Ronald Scott may refer to:

 Bon Scott (Ronald Belford Scott, 1946–1980), Scottish-Australian singer and songwriter
 Ron Scott (sports administrator) (1928–2016), New Zealand sports administrator
 Ronald B. Scott (1945–2020), American author, journalist and pundit
 Ron Scott (born 1960), Canadian ice hockey player
 Ron E. Scott (born 1967), Canadian film director
 Ron Scott (journalist) (1947–2018), Scottish sportswriter